Supersci, formerly Superscientifiku, is a Swedish hip hop group, composed of rapper Mr. Noun, rapper/producer Arka, rapper/singer Remedeeh, multi-instrumentalist/producer Erik L and DJ Observe. They hail from Sundsvall, Sweden. Arka and Erik L are also from the production team Flyphonic.

Discography
Studio albums
Pinetrees on the Pavement (2006)
Timelines (2010)
Entropy (2015)

Singles and EPs
Soundvalley EP (1998)
Syntax + Semantics EP (1999)
Aahyeahwhatchasay EP (2001)
How We Gonna Fail Now? EP (2002)
What It Is EP (2009)

Mixtapes
Cutting Down Trees (2007)

See also
Swedish hip hop

External links
 Official website

Swedish hip hop groups